Gennaro Cannavacciuolo (14 February 1962 – 24 May 2022) was an Italian actor, singer, and comedian. He is known for his roles in Un'estate al mare and La vita è una cosa meravigliosa.

References

External links
 

1962 births
2022 deaths
People from Pozzuoli
Italian male film actors
Italian male stage actors
Italian male television actors
Italian male musical theatre actors
Italian male comedians
Italian cabaret performers
20th-century Italian male singers
21st-century Italian male singers
20th-century Italian male actors
21st-century Italian male actors
20th-century Italian comedians
21st-century Italian comedians